RAF Barton Bendish was an airfield for the Royal Air Force located on the far side of the Downham Market to Swaffham road from its parent station, RAF Marham. It was built because at the outbreak of the Second World War it was considered important for bomber stations to have a satellite airfield. The only aircraft known to have operated out of Barton Bendish were Vickers Wellington bombers from Marham. It was abandoned in 1942, as it was considered too close to the parent station to be developed further.
 No. 26 Squadron RAF.
 No. 268 Squadron RAF.

See also
Royal Air Force station
List of former Royal Air Force stations
List of Royal Air Force aircraft squadrons

References

External links
Wikimapia - Barton Bendish

Royal Air Force stations in Norfolk
Royal Air Force stations of World War II in the United Kingdom